Gorleston South Pier Lighthouse and Coastwatch watch station is located in the town of Gorleston in the English county of Norfolk. The lighthouse and station is located at the end of the south pier of seaport on the south side of Great Yarmouth.

History
The first lighthouse was established here in 1852 was an octagonal brick tower of similar height to the present lighthouse building. The building today was built in 1955 and was also the harbourmaster's office, later re-located.

Operation
The light of today is mounted on the roof along with communications equipment, harbour control lights, and the fog horn that when used, sounds three blasts every 60 seconds. The lighthouse is operated by the Great Yarmouth Port Authority.
The watchtower is now home to the Gorleston Branch of the National Coastwatch Institution which has over 60 Volunteer members and act as the eyes and ears of HM Coast Guard. The crew watches from 0800hrs to 2000hrs in the summer (March to October) and 0800hrs to 1600hrs in the winter. (October to March)

See also

 List of lighthouses in England

References

External links

 Gorleston National Coastwatch Institution

Lighthouses completed in 1955
Lighthouses in Norfolk
Gorleston-on-Sea
1955 establishments in England